KJYL is a Christian radio station licensed to Eagle Grove, Iowa, broadcasting on 100.7 MHz FM. KJYL serves the Fort Dodge, Iowa area. The station is owned by Minn-Iowa Christian Broadcasting, Inc.

Translators
KJYL is also heard locally in Newell, Iowa, through a translator on 96.3 FM.

References

External links
KJYL's official website

JYL
Radio stations established in 1994
1994 establishments in Iowa